Taja Berwala is a town of Bhawana Tehsil in  the Chiniot District of Punjab province, Pakistan. It is located at left bank of the river Chenab.
The village is governed by Chadhar tribe. The political personality of this town also holds strong position in the Chadhar community.

Populated places in Chiniot District
Chiniot District